The 2017–18 Goa Professional League is the 20th season of the Goa Professional League, the top football league in the Indian state of Goa, since its establishment 1996. The league began on 1 October 2017 and will conclude in March 2018. 

The first phase of the league matches are being played at the Duler Stadium and second phase of the league matches will be played at the Tilak Maidan.

Salgaocar are the defending champions.

Teams

Standings

References

Goa Professional League seasons
2017–18 in Indian football leagues